Primo Volpi (26 April 1916 – 28 November 2006) was an Italian racing cyclist. He rode in the 1947 and 1948 Tour de France.

Major results

1940
 1st Stage 9 Giro d'Italia
1945
 2nd Giro di Campania
 3rd Giro del Piemonte
1946
 10th Overall Giro d'Italia
1948
 5th Overall Giro d'Italia
1949
 1st Stage 7 Giro di Sicilia
 1st Stage 4 Giro del Lazio
1950
 1st Stage 14 Tour d'Algérie
 2nd Giro di Toscana
1951
 1st Overall Giro di Sicilia
 1st  Overall Volta a Catalunya
1952
 1st Coppa Bernocchi
 1st Coppa Sabatini
1953
 1st Coppa Sabatini
 1st Stage 6 GP Mediterraneo
 1st Stage 5 Giro di Sicilia
 3rd Overall Giro della Provincia di Reggio Calabria
 4th Giro del Veneto
1954
 1st Overall Tour d'Europe
1st Stage 11
 7th Overall Tour de Suisse
1st Stage 6
 9th Giro di Lombardia
1955
 1st Stage 6 Vuelta a Asturias

References

External links
 

1916 births
2006 deaths
Italian male cyclists
Sportspeople from the Province of Siena
Cyclists from Tuscany
Tour de Suisse stage winners